The 1952 United States presidential election in Ohio took place on November 4, 1952, as part of the 1952 United States presidential election. State voters chose 25 representatives, or electors, to the Electoral College, who voted for president and vice president.

Ohio was won by Columbia University President Dwight D. Eisenhower (R–New York), running with Senator Richard Nixon, with 56.76% of the popular vote, against Adlai Stevenson (D–Illinois), running with Senator John Sparkman, with 43.24% of the popular vote. This result made Ohio around 2.6% more Republican than the nation-at-large. 

Eisenhower’s victory was the first of three consecutive Republican victories in the state, as Ohio would not vote Democratic again until Lyndon B. Johnson’s landslide victory in 1964.

Results

Results by county

See also
 United States presidential elections in Ohio

References

Ohio
1952
1952 Ohio elections